This is a discography of Canadian grindcore band Fuck the Facts.

Studio albums
It is debatable which is the "first" Fuck the Facts full length album.  At different times, the band has referred to both the self-titled tape, and the Discoing the Dead CD-R as the first.  Their older website states that the self-titled release is the first recording.  This discrepancy is most likely because Discoing the Dead was the first Fuck the Facts release (including the splits released at that time) not on cassette.  Additionally, Escunta was released almost a year and a half after it was recorded.  Its style is more noise oriented (like Vagina Dancer) and it sometimes gets forgotten in discography lists by sites not affiliated with the band.

The list below reflects that all of these releases were considered the equivalent of "full length albums" at the time of their release, and were (and still are) considered official releases by the band.

2000: Fuck the Facts (Dedfuk Records)
2000: Vagina Dancer (Where Late the Bird Sang)
2001: Discoing the Dead (Ghetto Blaster Recordings)
Reissued and remastered in 2003 on Black Hole Productions
2001: Mullet Fever (Ghetto Blaster Recordings)
Reissued and remastered in 2005 on Sonic Deadline Records
2002: Escunta (Mandarangan Recordings)
2003: Backstabber Etiquette (Grind It! Records)
2006: Stigmata High-Five (Relapse Records)
2008: Disgorge Mexico (Relapse Records)
2011: Die Miserable (Relapse Records)
2015: Desire Will Rot (Noise Salvation)
2020: Pleine Noirceur (Noise Salvation)

Live albums
2003: Live Damage (Smell the Stench)
2010: Live in Whitby (Self Released)

Compilation albums
2006: Collection of Splits 2002-2004 (Great White North Records)
Reissued in 2007 by Galy Records following the demise of Great White North Records
2010: St. Jean Baptiste 2010 (Self Released)
2011: 10 Fucking Years (Self Released)

Extended plays
2001: Four0ninE (Self Released)
2005: Legacy of Hopelessness (Ghetto Blaster Recordings / Capital Kill Records)
2008: The Wreaking (Self Released)
2010: Unnamed EP (Self Released)
2011: Misery (Self Released) 
2013: Amer (Self Released)

Video albums
2010: Disgorge Mexico: The DVD

Music videos
2005: "Medicated Like a Motherfucker" (created by Topon Das)
2005: "Roach"
2006: "The Wreaking" 
2006: "The Sound Of Your Smashed Head" (directed by David Hall) 
2010: "Wake" (directed by Michael Panduro for Siegfried Productions)

Splits

Early in their career, the main avenue for releasing music was in the form of splits with other bands on small, do-it-yourself labels.  This trend is shown by the amount of splits released between 2000 and 2003, compared with the relatively fewer splits released between 2004 and 2008.
2000: Split with Cult of the Damned (Grindrot D.I.Y. Productions)
2000: Split with Longdreamdead (Abhorrent Creation Tapes)
2000: Split with S.M.E.S. (Dedfuk Records / Zas! Autoproduzioni)
2000: Primitive Instinct - Split with C.A.D., Diktat, Psychoneurosis and Godless Truth (Symbolic Productions)
2001: Split with Inhumate, Bloodshed, Mastectomia and Pulmonary Fibrosis (Unite Bleeding Tapes / Abhorrent Creation Tapes)
2001: Split with Mastectomia (Unite Bleeding Tapes)
2001: A Japanese Winter - Split with Mourmansk 150 and De Madeliefjes (Symbolic Productions)
2001: Split with Ames Sanglantes (Ghetto Blaster Recordings)
2001: Split with S.M.E.S. (Impregnate Records)
2002: Split with Conure (Ghetto Blaster Recordings)
2002: Innocence Is Not Lost, It is Taken - Split with Retch (Vendredi 13 Recordings)
2002: Split with P.O.T (Prole Records)
2002: Split with Skoda 120 (Beer Is Not Drink Records)
2002: Split with Kastrat (Zas! Autoproduzioni / Nuclear Assault Records)
2002: The Great One - Split with No Refund and Mermaid In A Manhole (Ghetto Blaster Recordings)
2002: Split with Iron Bitchface (Slut Factory Records)
2002: Split with Jan AG (Symbolic Productions)
2002: Split with Monolith (Melt Sultan Records)
2002: Split with Manherringbone (Idol Records)
2002: Born in a Riot - Collaborative CD-R with Fever Spoor (Anima Mal Nata Records)
2003: Split with Banzai 606 (First Aid Productions)
2003: Split with Necrobestiality and Winters In Osaka (My Lai Productions)
2003: Split with Hewhocorrupts, Distorcion Social and Obbrobrio (My Lai Productions)
2003: Split with Jan AG (N:C:U)
2003: She's Hot! - Split with Ultrapodre (War Productions)
2003: Split with Sylvester Staline (Anvil of Fury Records)
2003: Split with Feeble Minded (Grodhaisn Productions)
2004: Overseas Connection - Split with Sergent Slaughter (Meat 5000 Records / Undecent Records)
2004: Split with S.M.E.S. (Compilation of the two previous splits together) (Fecal-Matter Discorporated)
2004: Split with Cakewet (Human Circus Records)
2004: Split with Subcut (Bucho Discos)
2005: Split with Narcosis, Midget Parade and Archer (Privileged to Fail Records)
2006: Split with Pleasant Valley (Reprocreate Records)
2006: Split with Mesrine (Sonic Deadline Records)
2007: 4625 - Split with The Crinn, World Downfall and Nesseria (IV Seasons Records)
2008: Split with Leng Tch'e (Power It Up Records)
2009: Live Split with Mincing Fury and Guttural Clamour of Queer Decay (Burning Dogma Records)

Promos
Most of these releases were given out free at concerts to show fans upcoming music from the band.
2002: Bastardizing Canada: Summer 2002 Tour (contains 2 unmastered tracks from the upcoming Backstabber Etiquette, one noise track and one live recording)
2002: Winter 2002 Tour EP (contains 4 songs taken from the upcoming split with Sylvester Staline)
2003: Promo 2003 (contains 2 tracks taken from the upcoming split CD with Feeble Minded and 2 tracks taken from Backstabber Etiquette)
2004: Promo Winter 2004 (contains 2 tracks from the split with Sergeant Slaughter and 2 tracks from the split with Feeble Minded)

Other appearances
Over the years, Fuck the Facts has made appearances on many compilations, zine samplers, tribute albums and other releases.  Many of the release dates are unknown, so they are organized alphabetically below.  In some cases, very little information is available, and only a compilations existence is known.  Information is included where available.

Compilation appearances

Tributes

Magazine compilations

References

External links
Fuck the Facts discography as listed on their current website.
Fuck the Facts at discogs.com.  This is not complete, but has more details about each release that is sourced from the releases themselves.
Fuck the Facts at Encyclopaedia Metallum.  This is more complete, but contains information sourced from all over the internet.
Old Fuck the Facts discography page ca. 2004.
Old Fuck the Facts discography page ca. early 2000s.

Discographies of Canadian artists
Heavy metal group discographies